Shooting competitions at the 2022 Mediterranean Games was held from 28 June to 3 July 2022 at the Hassi Ben Okba Shooting Center.

Medal summary

Men's events

Women's events

Mixed events

Medal table

References

External links
2022 Mediterranean Games – Shooting
Results book

Sports at the 2022 Mediterranean Games
2022
Mediterranean Games
Shooting competitions in Algeria